Jayakar's seahorse (Hippocampus jayakari) is a species of coastal fish of the family Syngnathidae. It is found in the Western Indian Ocean, from the Red and Arabian seas to the central coast of Pakistan. It is expected to feed on small crustaceans, similar to other seahorses. This species is ovoviviparous, with males carrying eggs in a brood pouch before giving birth to live young. The specific name and the common name honours the Indian physician, linguist and ichthyologist Dr. Surgeon-Major Atmaram Sadashiv "Muscati" Jayakar (1844-1911).

References

Hippocampus (genus)
Taxa named by George Albert Boulenger
Fish described in 1900
Taxonomy articles created by Polbot